"Shine We Are! / Earthsong"  is BoA's ninth Japanese single and was one of the top 100 Japanese singles in 2003 according to the Oricon chart from December 2, 2002 to November 24, 2003.

Track listing
 Shine We Are!
 Earthsong
 Valenti (Junior Vasquez Radio Mix, English Version)
 Shine We Are! (Instrumental)
 Earthsong (Instrumental)

Charts
Oricon Chart (Japan)

BoA songs
2003 singles
Dance-pop songs